Oon Jin Gee (born 13 June 1967) is a retired Singaporean freestyle swimmer. He competed at the 1984 Summer Olympics and the 1988 Summer Olympics. His older brother, Oon Jin Teik, also competed at the Olympics.

References

External links
 
 

1967 births
Living people
Singaporean male freestyle swimmers
Olympic swimmers of Singapore
Swimmers at the 1984 Summer Olympics
Swimmers at the 1988 Summer Olympics
Place of birth missing (living people)
Asian Games medalists in swimming
Asian Games bronze medalists for Singapore
Swimmers at the 1986 Asian Games
Medalists at the 1986 Asian Games
Southeast Asian Games medalists in swimming
Southeast Asian Games gold medalists for Singapore
Southeast Asian Games silver medalists for Singapore
Competitors at the 1985 Southeast Asian Games